The Republic Advisory Committee was a committee established by the then Australian Prime Minister Paul Keating in April 1993 to examine the constitutional and legal issues that would arise were Australia to become a republic. The committee's mandate was to "prepare an options paper describing 'the minimum constitutional changes necessary to achieve a viable Federal Republic of Australia, maintaining the effect of our current conventions and principles of government'." The committee was asked to consider issues such as

 a name for a new elected head of state;
 the method of selection for the head of state;
 what powers he or she should possess;
 the constitutional amendments and legal changes required to replace the Queen of Australia and Her Representative, the Governor-General of Australia by an elected head of state.

Republic Advisory Committee membership

The Republic Advisory Committee submitted two Volumes (Volume I - The Options and Volume II - the Appendices) to the Australian prime minister in late 1993. Part of Volume II was concerned with the international experience in moving from monarchical to republican headships of state. Six international reports were commissioned from local experts; four of the countries were former Commonwealth monarchies, while two had experienced their own regime change when their own monarchies (the Hohenzollerns in Germany, the Habsburgs in Austria) were replaced by republics.

Reports commissioned by the Republic Advisory Committee

The recommendations made by the committee were never voted on by the Australian people. A Constitutional Convention was held in 1998, resulting in a slightly different proposal which was rejected by the Australian electorate in the 1999 referendum.

Additional information
Copies of the Reports were published under the following ISBNs

See also
Republicanism in Australia
Bi-partisan appointment republican model
Direct election republican model

References

External links
Republican History - the Republic Advisory Committee

 
Republicanism in Australia